Gustave Marius Wuyts (27 February 1903 – 13 January 1979) was a Belgian tug of war competitor and shot putter. He  competed in the 1920 Summer Olympics. In 1920 he won the bronze medal as a member of the Belgian tug of war team.

References

External links
 profile

1903 births
1979 deaths
Olympic athletes of Belgium
Olympic tug of war competitors of Belgium
Athletes (track and field) at the 1920 Summer Olympics
Tug of war competitors at the 1920 Summer Olympics
Olympic bronze medalists for Belgium
Olympic medalists in tug of war
Belgian male shot putters
Medalists at the 1920 Summer Olympics